Timpanogos Cave National Monument is a United States National Monument protecting the Timpanogos Cave Historic District and a
cave system on Mount Timpanogos in American Fork Canyon in the Wasatch Range, near Highland, Utah, in the United States. The site is managed by the National Park Service. The three caves of the system, one of which is specifically called Timpanogos Cave, are only viewable on guided tours when the monument is open, usually from May through September depending on snow conditions and funding. There is the standard tour going through the cave system, and an Introduction to Caving tour which teaches Leave No Trace caving and goes further into Hansen Cave.

Three caves

The three caves of the Monument that are tourable are: Hansen Cave, Middle Cave, and Timpanogos Cave. The three caves are connected by manmade tunnels blasted in the 1930s by the Works Progress Administration . The average temperature in the caves is 46 degrees Fahrenheit. Many colorful cave features or speleothems can be seen. Among the most interesting are the helictites, which are hollowed, twisted, spiraling straws of deposited calcite or aragonite. They are formed when water travels through the tube and then evaporates, leaving a trace mineral deposit at the end. Other speleothems found in the cave include: cave bacon, cave columns, flowstone, cave popcorn, cave drapery, stalactites and stalagmites.

Discovery of the caves
Martin Hansen discovered what became known as Hansen Cave in October 1887, reportedly while cutting timber he tracked cougar footprints high up the side of American Fork Canyon.  Many of the features and formations in this chamber were damaged or removed by the Duke Onyx Company and the general public before the cave was made a national monument.

In 1913, a second cave was discovered nearby. While in the area to explore Hansen Cave with their families, James W. Gough and Frank Johnson were climbing an adjacent slope when they discovered the entrance to what is now known as Timpanogos Cave. Several others later entered the cave and viewed many of the formations inside, including the Great Heart of Timpanogos. However, before long knowledge of the cave and its entrance was lost. Some sources indicate that the entrance was lost due to a landslide in the area, while others say it was, in part, caused by the extreme secrecy of the original finders. Several years later, after hearing rumors of another cave, Vearl J Manwill came with a group of associates (which later became the Payson Alpine Club) in search of the mysterious hidden cave.  On 14 February 1921 he rediscovered it (although many sources credit him as having discovered the cave).  He immediately shared the information with the other members of the group. Having in mind the extreme damage that had resulted in Hansen Cave, that very night, the group dedicated themselves to the preservation of the cave. Of that night, Manwill wrote in his journal that they discussed ways "to preserve its beauty for posterity instead of allowing it to be vandalized as Hansen's Cave had been." Shortly thereafter they reported their find to the US Forest Service.

Later that fall, on 15 October 1921, George Heber Hansen and Wayne E. Hansen, Martin Hansen's son and grandson, were hunting on the other side of the canyon. While using binoculars to try to find deer, they came across another hole in the mountain, in between the other two caves. In a few days they came back, with 74-year-old Martin Hansen. Martin was the first to enter the cave, now called Middle Cave.

Current tours of the cave system enter the caves though a manmade entrance very close to the entrance discovered by Martin Hansen. Passing through a manmade tunnel, tours continue on to Middle Cave, before passing through another manmade tunnel to Timpanogos Cave.  Finally, tours return to the surface through a manmade exit near the original entrance.

Administration
Although the site was designated a national monument on October 14, 1922, the site was initially developed and maintained by the U.S. Forest Service. The National Park Service took over management in 1933. A number of park structures were built by the Works Progress Administration in the 1930s and early 1940s.  The Timpanogos Cave Historic District was designated in 1982 to include these structures.

Middle Cave and Timpanogos Cave were discovered in an era where their formations and resources could be protected. The National Park Service, which oversees and preserves the cave complex, has continued to develop new ways to retain its natural features, including limiting lighting in the caves to retard growth of invasive organisms. Preservation is a high priority. The resource management team at the monument is actively involved in protecting the cave and its surroundings. The National Park Service is continually monitoring and striving to determine a successful balance between visitor access and cave preservation. A limited number of people per tour was implemented to help lessen the human impacts in the caves.

The National Park Service also balances preservation with the needs of the Monument's staff.  The Monument's original visitor center burned down in 1991, and the visitor center was housed in a double wide trailer house for almost three decades.  With the temporary visitor center in a dangerous rock-fall zone, plans for a new center came under consideration. Following the monument closing for the season in September 2018, construction began on the new trailhead and visitor center. The trail and monument reopened to the public in June 2019.

Geology
The cave system is located in the Deseret Limestone, a Mississippian age limestone formed around 340 million years ago. Notably the cave cavity was formed initially by a series of faults running off of the Wasatch fault. Since that time hydrothermal water action perhaps similar to that of Cave of the Winds in Colorado, and uplift of the Wasatch Mountains has formed the modern cave system. The speleothems first started to form within the last 750,000 years, based on paleomagnetism of iron deposits within the formations, as the cave system has been slowly lifted above the unnamed stream that flows though the canyon (and becomes the American Fork [river] at the mouth of the canyon).

See also

 List of national monuments of the United States
 Protected areas of the United States
 Mount Timpanogos

References

External links

 
 Official Utah travel site page about the caves
 A large collection of Timpanogos Cave speleothem pictures 
 Local caving grotto
 photos of the Timpanogos Cave National Monument
 Environmental Impact Statement, General Management Plan
 Planned Improvements for Timpanogos Cave National Monument
 Martin Hansen (Find A Grave)

National Park Service National Monuments in Utah
Caves of Utah
Protected areas of Utah County, Utah
Protected areas established in 1922
Landforms of Utah County, Utah
Show caves in the United States
Wasatch Range
1922 establishments in Utah